The 1905 Virginia Orange and Blue football team represented the University of Virginia as an independent during the 1905 college football season. Led by first-year head coach William C. "King" Cole, the Orange and Blue compiled a record of 6–4.

Schedule

References

Virginia
Virginia Cavaliers football seasons
Virginia Orange and Blue football